Mwene-Ditu Airport  is an airport serving the city of Mwene-Ditu in Lomami Province, Democratic Republic of the Congo.

See also

Transport in the Democratic Republic of the Congo
List of airports in the Democratic Republic of the Congo

References

External links
 FallingRain - Mwene-Ditu
 HERE Maps - Mwene-Ditu
 OpenStreetMap - Mwene-Ditu
 OurAirports - Mwene-Ditu
 

Airports in Lomami